Downey may refer to:

People
Downey (surname)
Robert Downey Jr.

Places
Downey, California, US
Downey, Idaho, US
Downey, Iowa, US

Businesses
W. & D. Downey, photographic studio
Downey Studios, created out of a former Boeing plant

Schools
Downey High School
Thomas Downey High School

Downy
Downy (fabric softener)
Downy Birch
Drooping Brome (Downy Brome)
Downy Emerald
Downy Hawthorn
Downy Hempnettle
Downy mildew
Downy Oak
Downy Serviceberry (disambiguation)
Downy Woodpecker

See also
Downie, a surname